This page provides the summaries of the CONCACAF Second Round matches for the 2006 FIFA World Cup qualification. The 14 top-ranked teams from the FIFA ranking for CONCACAF in May 2007 competed, along with the 10 winning teams from the First Round.

There were 94 goals scored in 24 matches, for an average of 3.92 goals per match.

Format
In this round 12 of the remaining 24 teams would be eliminated. There were 12 ties and the winners advanced to the next round. All games were scheduled to be played in home and away format.

Matches

United States won 6–2 on aggregate and advanced to the Third Round.

El Salvador won 4–3 on aggregate and advanced to the Third Round.

Jamaica won 4–1 on aggregate and advanced to the Third Round.

Panama won 7–0 on aggregate and advanced to the Third Round.

Costa Rica won on the away goals rule after drawing 3–3 on aggregate and advanced to the Third Round.

Guatemala won 4–2 on aggregate and advanced to the Third Round.

Honduras won 6–1 on aggregate and advanced to the Third Round.

Canada won 8–0 on aggregate and advanced to the Third Round.

Mexico won 18–0 on aggregate and advanced to the Third Round.

Saint Kitts and Nevis won 5–2 on aggregate and advanced to the Third Round.

Trinidad & Tobago won 6–0 on aggregate and advanced to the Third Round.

Saint Vincent and the Grenadines won 6–3 on aggregate and advanced to the Third Round.

See also

2006 FIFA World Cup qualification (CONCACAF)
Qual
Q1
Q1
Q1
Q1